Theodor Schwenk (8 October 1910, in Schwäbisch Gmünd – 29 September 1986, in Filderstadt) was an anthroposophist, engineer and a pioneering water researcher who founded the Institute for Flow. He is most well known for his book Sensitive Chaos which explores subtle patterns and phenomenon of water, air and their relationship to biological forms. The narrative of the book is in the tradition of Goethe and Rudolf Steiner, viewing nature as ruled by a single unifying principle which is apparent in all movement and form.

1910 births
1986 deaths
People from Schwäbisch Gmünd
People from the Kingdom of Württemberg
Anthroposophists
Chaos theorists